Trương Ngọc Tơn (born 3 February 1960) is a Vietnamese former swimmer. He competed in two events at the 1980 Summer Olympics. He is from Thái Bình Province.

References

External links
 

1960 births
Living people
Vietnamese male swimmers
Olympic swimmers of Vietnam
Swimmers at the 1980 Summer Olympics
Place of birth missing (living people)
People from Thái Bình province